"Travolta" (also known as "Quote Unquote") was the first single released by American experimental rock band Mr. Bungle. It was featured on their self-titled debut album.

Controversy
Although the song was originally titled "Travolta", it was quickly changed to "Quote Unquote" due to legal threats. A music video was made for "Travolta", using its later title "Quote Unquote". The video was banned from MTV due to images of the band members (dressed in various costumes and masks) hanging from meat hooks and overall scary, disturbing images. The video used the single version of the song.

References to John Travolta
Allmusic considers the song to be a tribute to John Travolta and fellow actor Patrick Swayze, although it also contains references to Adolf Hitler and Donald Trump. A biography about John Travolta, written by Bob McCabe, was titled Quote, Unquote after the song. The main theme from the 1978 movie Grease, a film John Travolta was famous for, was sampled twice in the song.  

According to Trey Spruance in a 2016 interview:

Track listing
 "Quote Unquote" (edit) – 4:31	
 "Quote Unquote" (album version) – 6:56

References

1991 singles
Songs written by Mike Patton
1991 songs
Experimental music compositions
Warner Records singles
Mr. Bungle songs
Music videos directed by Kevin Kerslake
Avant-garde metal songs
Songs written by Trey Spruance